Blockstream is a blockchain technology company led by co-founder Adam Back, headquartered in Victoria, Canada, with offices and staff worldwide. The company develops a range of products and services for the storage and transfer of Bitcoin and other digital assets.

The company has raised $210M to date from investors, including venture capital firms Horizons Ventures, Mosaic Ventures, and AXA Strategic Ventures.

Products

The Liquid Network 
On October 12, 2015, Blockstream announced the release of its Liquid sidechain prototype which could allow for the transfer of assets between the Liquid sidechain and the bitcoin main blockchain. On October 11, 2018, a production-ready implementation of the Liquid sidechain was officially launched, called the Liquid Network, which is designed to facilitate interoperability between the Bitcoin main chain and the Liquid sidechain to extend Bitcoin’s capabilities.

Liquid is built using Elements Core, a sidechain protocol also designed by Blockstream and built on the Bitcoin Core codebase,  which introduces several new features including Confidential Transactions, Segregated Witnesses (or SegWit), native asset issuance, and new opcodes. Elements Core version 0.18.1.6 was released in March 2020.

Blockstream claims that Liquid reduces the delays and friction involved in a normal transfer of bitcoin. Blockstream asserts participating exchanges–including Bitfinex, BitMEX and OKCoin–can reduce counterparty risk for traders and enable near-instant financial transactions between their platform and other exchanges or a trader’s wallet(s). New blocks are added to the Liquid sidechain every minute, as opposed to Bitcoin's 10-minute block interval.

Blockstream Satellite
In 2017 Blockstream announced the availability of one-way satellite broadcasting of the full Bitcoin blockchain to enable the propagation of valid bitcoin transactions to people without Internet access or during a disruption event like an Internet blackout. In 2018 Blockstream extended the Bitcoin satellite network to four satellites across six coverage zones, adding Asia and Pacific region coverage, and released API specifications to allow users to send data over its network. The network as of 2019 is only a one-way network and the user still needs a connection to the Bitcoin network to send transactions, which can include SMS gateways or higher cost internet which would be expensive for receiving full Bitcoin block data, but is cost effective to send a single transaction.

File Transmission Service
Using the Lightning Network as a means of payment, Blockstream Satellite provides a low-cost file transmission service where anyone may transmit data on its global broadcast satellite network with the important property that receivers are completely untraceable, providing an unrivaled level of privacy that is simply not achievable over conventional networks such as the Internet. The service requires no special hardware and is fully compatible with existing equipment for watching satellite TV on computers.

Cryptocurrency Data Feed
In early 2018 Blockstream announced a partnership with Intercontinental Exchange Inc., or ICE, to launch a cryptocurrency market data feed. Financial firms using this feed receive comprehensive historical price and market depth data for hundreds of crypto and fiat currency pairs from more than 15 cryptocurrency exchanges around the world.

Industry Partnerships

Digital Garage 
Blockstream partnered with Digital Garage, an Internet technology company based in Tokyo, in January 2019 to create Crypto Garage, a joint venture dedicated to building Bitcoin and blockchain technology for the Japanese institutional market. The initiative's first product, called SETTLENET, is a protocol designed to enable institutional use of atomic swaps. Crypto Garage is one of the first fintech companies in the Japanese Cabinet Secretariat's regulatory sandbox program for blockchain companies.

Research and open source initiatives 
In addition to its corporate initiatives, Blockstream is also involved in a number of open source programs.

Bitcoin 

Blockstream employs some prominent Bitcoin Core developers. Blockstream engineers developed a simplified Bitcoin smart contract development language called Miniscript, which currently has implementations in C++ and Rust.

Lightning Network 

Blockstream developer Rusty Russell was the first Bitcoin developer to try implementing the Lightning Network during the summer of 2015. Blockstream released version 0.8.1 of c-lightning, its own implementation of the Lightning Network, in February 2020.

Cryptographic privacy and security research
Blockstream has published work on Confidential Assets, Confidential Transactions, secure multi- and aggregate signatures, and Simplicity, a blockchain programming language.

References

External links
 

2014 establishments in California
Bitcoin companies
Software companies based in the San Francisco Bay Area
Software companies of the United States